Bhagirath Samai (born 11 August 1957), is an Indian professional shooter who represented his country at the 1984 Summer Olympics. He won a bronze medal at the 1986 Asian Games, for which performance he was awarded the Arjuna Award. He participated in two South Asian Games, two Asian Games, two Asian Shooting Championships, two Commonwealth Games and one Olympic Games.

Career

Notable international performance

Awards and recognition

He was awarded the Arjuna Award in Shooting in 1986 for winning a Bronze Medal in the 1986 Asian Games

 He receives a life time Pension worth 6000 /- INR per month from the Ministry of Youth Affairs and Sports for his performance in international events.
 Midnapore rifle club gave him the title 'King of the Rifle of India'.

Personal life
Bhagirath Samai was born in Asansol and is the youngest of his brothers. He said that he took shooting to reluctantly, but later fell in love with the sport. He married Rina Samai in 1992.

He currently does service for a construction company in Haldia, living away from family.

References

External links
 

1957 births
Living people
Indian male sport shooters
ISSF rifle shooters
Olympic shooters of India
People from Asansol
Shooters at the 1984 Summer Olympics
Commonwealth Games medallists in shooting
Commonwealth Games bronze medallists for India
Asian Games medalists in shooting
Asian Games bronze medalists for India
Shooters at the 1982 Asian Games
Shooters at the 1986 Asian Games
Medalists at the 1986 Asian Games
Shooters at the 1982 Commonwealth Games
Shooters at the 1990 Commonwealth Games
Recipients of the Arjuna Award
Medallists at the 1990 Commonwealth Games